Angelo Hugues (born 3 September 1966) is a French former professional footballer who played as a goalkeeper for AS Monaco, Olympique Lyonnais and Wisła Kraków among others before his retirement.

Whilst at Guingamp he won the 1996 UEFA Intertoto Cup.

Honours
Guingamp
 UEFA Intertoto Cup: 1996

Lyon
 Coupe de la Ligue: 2000–01

Wisła Kraków
 Ekstraklasa: 2002–03
 Polish Cup: 2002–03

References

External links
 
 

Living people
1966 births
Sportspeople from Dunkirk
French footballers
Footballers from Hauts-de-France
Association football goalkeepers
Ligue 1 players
Ligue 2 players
Ekstraklasa players
AS Monaco FC players
En Avant Guingamp players
FC Lorient players
Olympique Lyonnais players
Wisła Kraków players
SC Bastia players
French expatriate footballers
French expatriate sportspeople in Poland
Expatriate footballers in Poland
French expatriate sportspeople in Qatar
Expatriate footballers in Qatar